"Wild and Blue" is a song written by John Scott Sherrill, and recorded by American country music artist John Anderson.  It was released in September 1982 as the first single and title track from the album Wild & Blue.  The song was Anderson's eleventh country hit and the first of five number ones on the country chart.  The single went to number one for two weeks and spent a total of eleven weeks within the top 40.  John's sister Donna Kay Anderson provides background vocals.

Punk-folk band The Mekons covered "Wild and Blue" on their 1991 album Curse of the Mekons. The alternative country band Freakwater also recorded their cover of the song in 1991, for their album "Dancing Under Water." The 2014 re-issue of Lucinda Williams' self-titled album includes a live cover of "Wild and Blue", recorded on her 1989 European tour.

Hank Williams Jr. covered the song on his 1984 album Major Moves.

The Country/Southern Rock Band The Steel Woods covered the song on their 2017 album Straw in the Wind. The song was covered by Brent Cobb on the 2022 John Anderson tribute album Something Borrowed, Something New.

Charts

References

1982 singles
John Anderson (musician) songs
Hank Williams Jr. songs
Songs written by John Scott Sherrill
Warner Records singles
1982 songs